Kaputa is a constituency of the National Assembly of Zambia. It covers the towns of Kaputa, Nkonta and Nkoshya in Kaputa District of Northern Province.

List of MPs

References

Constituencies of the National Assembly of Zambia
1973 establishments in Zambia
Constituencies established in 1973